Cururupu is a municipality in the state of Maranhão in the Northeast region of Brazil.

The waters offshore from the municipality contain the  Parcel de Manuel Luís Marine State Park, created in 1991 to protect the largest coral reef of South America.

See also
List of municipalities in Maranhão

References

Municipalities in Maranhão
Populated coastal places in Maranhão